Diminishing Between Worlds is the second studio album by American death metal band Decrepit Birth. It was released on January 29, 2008 through Unique Leader Records. It was voted the best album of 2008 by MetalReview.com for the melodic experimentations by the band.

Track listing
"The Living Doorway"  – 4:23
"Reflection of Emotions"  – 4:16
"Diminishing Between Worlds"  – 3:51
"Dimensions Intertwine"  – 3:45
"The Enigmatic Form"  – 3:15 
"A Gathering of Imaginations"  – 4:07
"Through Alchemy Bound Eternal"  – 4:29  
"...And Time Begins"  – 3:51
"Await the Unending" – 5:17
"Essence of Creation" – 6:34
"The Morpheus Oracle (Outro)" – 0:56

Personnel
 Bill Robinson – vocals
 Matt Sotelo – guitars, bass, keyboards, backing vocals
 KC Howard – drums
 Ty Oliver – outro solo on "The Enigmatic Form"

References

2008 albums
Unique Leader Records albums
Decrepit Birth albums
Albums with cover art by Dan Seagrave